H. Nelson Wright (Henry Nelson Wright, 1870-1941) was an Indian civil servant and a numismatist, specialising in Indian numismatics.

Career
Nelson Wright was an Indian civil servant, but is best known for his work on Indian numismatics. He collected coins while working in India. His collection of Islamic coins is now in the British Museum and the Delhi Museum. His collection of Gupta coins is in the British Museum. He was a Fellow of the Royal Numismatic Society, and a founder member of the Indian Numismatic Society, and both societies recognized his contribution to the field by awarding him gold medals. The Numismatic Society of India now awards the Nelson Wright Medal for academic work in numismatics.

Awards and honours
 Awarded the Medal of the Royal Numismatic Society
 Awarded the gold medal of the Numismatic Society of India

Publications
 1906-28 (with Vincent Arthur Smith, and John Allan), Catalogue of the coins in the Indian Museum, Calcutta : including the Cabinet of the Asiatic Society of Bengal
 Catalogue of the coins of Indian Museum Calcutta including the Cabinet of the Asiatic Society of Bengal : vol 3 Mughal Emperors of India
 1932 "The Coinage of Malwa", Numismatic Chronicle 
 Coins of the Mughal Emperors of India (reprint 1975)
 1936 The coinage and metrology of the Sult̤āns of Dehlī : incorporating a catalogue of the coins in the author's cabinet now in the Dehlī Museum

References

Bibliography

External links
 H. Nelson Wright on worldcat.org
 H. Nelson Wright collection at the British Museum
 H Nelson Wright (in Portuguese)

British numismatists
Indian Civil Service (British India) officers
1870 births
1941 deaths